Arnaud Larrieu (born 31 March 1966) is a French film director and screenwriter. His film To Paint or Make Love was entered into the 2005 Cannes Film Festival.

Filmography

As director / screenwriter

As editor
 Court voyage (1987 - short)
 Temps couvert (1988 - documentary short)
 Les Baigneurs (1991 - short)
 Ce jour-là (1992 - documentary)
 Bernard ou Les apparitions (1993 - short)

As cinematographer
 Court voyage (1987 - short)
 Ce jour-là (1992 - documentary)
 Les Fenêtres sont ouvertes (2005 - documentary)

As actor
 Antonin (1989)
 A Man, a Real One (2003)
 Je suis une amoureuse (2007)

References

External links
 

French film directors
People from Lourdes
1966 births
Living people
French screenwriters
French film editors
French cinematographers